Edvardotrouessartia is an extinct genus of South American placental mammal that lived during the Middle Eocene of Patagonia. It belonged to the family Notostylopidae, and the order Notoungulata. It is among the many genera of South American ungulates that populated America during much of the Cenozoic, without leaving any modern descendants.

Etymology

Edvardotrouessartia was named to honor the french zoologist Édouard Louis Trouessart.

Characteristics

Edvardotrouessartia is the largest known member of the family Notostylopidae.

References

Notoungulates
Eocene mammals of South America
Paleogene Argentina
Fossils of Argentina
Fossil taxa described in 1901
Taxa named by Florentino Ameghino
Prehistoric placental genera
Golfo San Jorge Basin
Sarmiento Formation